The Alcorn State Braves and Lady Braves represent Alcorn State University in Lorman, Mississippi in intercollegiate athletics. They field 15 teams including men's and women's basketball, cross country, golf, tennis, and track and field; women's-only soccer, softball, and volleyball; and men's-only baseball and football. The Braves compete in NCAA Division I and are members of the Southwestern Athletic Conference.

Teams

References

External links